Shellingford Crossroads Quarry is a  geological Site of Special Scientific Interest west of Stanford in the Vale in Oxfordshire. It is a Geological Conservation Review site.

This site exposes rocks of the Corallian Group, dating to the Oxfordian stage of the Late Jurassic, around 160 million years ago. It has many fossils of corals and reef-dwelling bivalves, and it is also important as it provides an example of the complexity of Oxfordian stratigraphy.

References

Sites of Special Scientific Interest in Oxfordshire
Geological Conservation Review sites